Christopher Chisholm Barry (20 September 1925 – 7 February 2014) was a British television director. He worked extensively in BBC television drama and became best known for his work on the science fiction series Doctor Who. He also directed the direct to video Doctor Who spin-off Downtime in 1995.

Early life and education
Barry attended the University of Cambridge and served in the Royal Air Force.

Career
Barry became a trainee at Ealing Studios and worked on the film The Ship That Died of Shame (1955) as an assistant director to Basil Dearden. He subsequently joined the BBC as a production assistant in 1955.

In 1963 Barry was asked by producer Verity Lambert to be one of the initial directors of the BBC's new science fiction television series Doctor Who. Barry's work on Doctor Who went on to cover the longest span of any director during the original run of the series, overseeing episodes until 1979.

Among Barry's other television credits were episodes of Compact (1962), Ann Veronica (1964), Paul Temple (1970–71), Z-Cars (1971–78), Poldark (1975), The Onedin Line (1977), All Creatures Great and Small (1978–80), Juliet Bravo (1980) and Dramarama (1989). His other science fiction credits were for Out of the Unknown (1969), Moonbase 3 (1973) and The Tripods (1984). He appeared in a feature covering his life's work on the DVD release of the Doctor Who serial The Creature from the Pit (1979), released in May 2010.

Personal life

Barry lived in Oxfordshire in his retirement. He died following an escalator fall in a shopping centre in Banbury on 7 February 2014. An inquest into his death was held on 5 June 2014.

Doctor Who credits
 The Daleks – episodes 1, 2, 4 and 5 (1963–64)
 The Rescue (1965)
 The Romans (1965)
 The Savages (1966)
 The Power of the Daleks (1966)
 The Dæmons (1971)
 The Mutants (1972)
 Robot (1974)
 The Brain of Morbius (1976)
 The Creature from the Pit (1979)
 Downtime (1995)

References

External links

1925 births
2014 deaths
20th-century Royal Air Force personnel
Accidental deaths from falls
Accidental deaths in England
BBC people
British television directors
People from the Royal Borough of Greenwich
People from Oxfordshire